Triton Ballpark is the home field of the University of California San Diego Tritons college baseball team.

Stadium history

Triton Ballpark is a 500-seat baseball park located on the eastern half of the UC San Diego campus in the San Diego neighborhood of La Jolla. The stadium was upgraded in 2011 to include lights, allowing the first-ever night game to be played at the venue on January 29, 2011. A scoreboard was added in 2013. The Tritons' most recent league championship was won in 2014.

The ballpark underwent a significant renovation prior to the 2015 season. The $6.89 million renovation added a permanent grandstand to replace bleacher seating, restrooms, sunken dugouts, a press box, and a players' clubhouse down the right field line. The clubhouse, named for former UCSD chancellor Marye Anne Fox, includes locker rooms, offices, showers, laundry facilities, a Hall of Fame and a players' lounge.

References

External links
 Triton Ballpark home page

Baseball venues in California
College baseball venues in the United States
Sports venues in San Diego
UC San Diego Tritons baseball